Shubham Sharma (born 26 March 1997) is an Indian cricketer. He made his first-class debut for Rajasthan in the 2017–18 Ranji Trophy on 17 November 2017. He made his List A debut on 7 October 2019, for Rajasthan in the 2019–20 Vijay Hazare Trophy.

References

External links
 

1997 births
Living people
Indian cricketers
Place of birth missing (living people)
Rajasthan cricketers